Francis Melville may refer to:

Francis Dawes Melville, member of the Bombay civil service
Captain Melville (Francis McNeiss McNeil McCallum, died 1857), bushranger in Australia